Deh-e Miran (also Romanized as Deh-e Mīrān; also known as Mīrān) is a village in Qorqori Rural District, Qorqori District, Hirmand County, Sistan and Baluchestan Province, Iran. At the 2006 census, its population was 165, in 33 families.

References 

Populated places in Hirmand County